John Paul Tremblay (born May 17, 1968) is a Canadian actor, screenwriter, and comedian who is most well known for his role as Julian in the TV series Trailer Park Boys.

Career 
Before acting in Trailer Park Boys, Tremblay and his future co-star Robb Wells owned a chain of pizza restaurants called J.R. Capone's. Trailer Park Boys is written by Tremblay along with co-stars Robb Wells and Mike Smith. The Trailer Park Boys released a film in 2006, most of it being filmed in the municipality of Halifax. Tremblay and Wells also appeared in the 2002 family film Virginia's Run, though not as Ricky and Julian. 

In 2010, Tremblay appeared with many of his former Trailer Park Boys castmates in the new series The Drunk and On Drugs Happy Fun Time Hour.  In 2011, Tremblay again reunited with Trailer Park Boys castmates Robb Wells and Mike Smith for the live comedy show Drunk, High and Unemployed, which toured across the United States. 

Tremblay reunited with the Trailer Park Boys for an eighth and ninth season of the show which premiered on Netflix from September 5, 2014. Writing for seasons 10 & 11 began in January 2015. Filming began for season 10 in June 2015. Season 10 of the show was released March 28, 2016, the eleventh on March 31, 2017, and the twelfth and most recent season was released on March 30, 2018. This concluded with most of the main characters entering an animated reality after taking an overdose of hallucinogenic mushrooms, which led into Trailer Park Boys: The Animated Series released in 2019.

Filmography

Films

Television

References

External links

1968 births
Living people
20th-century Canadian male actors
21st-century Canadian male actors
Canadian male comedians
Canadian male film actors
Canadian male screenwriters
Canadian male television actors
Canadian male voice actors
Canadian people of French descent
Comedians from Nova Scotia
Male actors from Halifax, Nova Scotia
People from Cole Harbour, Nova Scotia